Seyyed Mohammad (also Romanized as Seyyed Moḩammad; also known as Seyyed Moḩammad-e Zardeh and Zardeh-ye Seyyed Moḩammad) is a village in Ban Zardeh Rural District, in the Central District of Dalahu County, Kermanshah Province, Iran. At the 2006 census, its population was 195, in 32 families.

References 

Populated places in Dalahu County